Ellis Carlo Iandolo (born 22 August 1997) is an English professional footballer who plays primarily as a left full-back for League Two club Swindon Town. Iandolo can also play at wing-back and in midfield.

Club career

Early career
Born in Chatham, Kent, Iandolo played for the Maidstone-based academy side Soccer Elite FA (SEFA), for whom he was playing against Gillingham which led to him being picked up by Kent's only Football League club. After being released in 2012 by The Gills, Iandolo returned to SEFA and in the summer of 2013 Iandolo became a Soccer Elite FA Scholar, combining full-time study with daily training with SEFA Scholarship coaches Lee Spiller and Andy Hessenthaler.

He signed for Maidstone United in July 2014. On 27 September 2014, Iandolo featured as an unused substitute in Maidstone's 2–1 home victory over Brentwood Town in their FA Cup second qualifying round tie.

Swindon Town
In July 2015, Iandolo impressed playing for the SEFA Scholars against Swindon Town's under 18s. The Robins duly offered him a trial and in August Iandolo was offered a one-year professional contract. Iandolo became the third SEFA Scholar to become a professional within the space of a year, following in the footsteps of Aaron Simpson and Kaiyne Woolery.

On 1 September 2015, Iandolo made his professional debut for Swindon during their Football League Trophy tie against Newport County, replacing Kevin Stewart in the 1–1 draw. Which Swindon eventually won 7–6 on penalties. On 8 July 2016, following his debut season, Iandolo signed a new one-year deal. On 6 December 2016, Iandolo netted his first goal for Swindon in a 3–2 away defeat during their EFL Trophy second round tie against Luton Town. Following the appointment of David Flitcroft, Iandolo's game time increased and he went onto score his first league goal during Swindon's 2–1 victory against Barnet, netting a 35-yard free-kick in the 17th minute. After starting every game in January 2018 he was replaced by the experienced Matthew Taylor who remained first choice at left-back until the end of the season.

At the start of the 2018/19 season, Swindon manager Phil Brown declared that Ellis was going to play as a midfielder, with Iandolo subsequently making 6 appearances in midfield by the end of October. Iandolo has been used as a left-back and left wing-back by current Swindon Town manager Richie Wellens. Ellis signed a two-year contract extension in July 2019 keeping him at the club until 2022.

Career statistics

Honours
Swindon Town
EFL League Two: 2019–20

References

External links
Ellis Iandolo profile at the Swindon Town F.C. profile

1997 births
Living people
Sportspeople from Chatham, Kent
Footballers from Kent
English footballers
Association football midfielders
Gillingham F.C. players
Maidstone United F.C. players
Swindon Town F.C. players
English Football League players